Calliotropis ceratophora is a species of sea snail, a marine gastropod mollusk in the family Eucyclidae.

Description
The shell can grow to be 28 mm in length.

Distribution
This species occurs in the Pacific Ocean off North and Central America.

References

External links
 To World Register of Marine Species

ceratophora
Gastropods described in 1896